Provincial Road 317 (PR 317) is a provincial road in the eastern part of the Canadian province of Manitoba.  It begins at Libau near Manitoba Highway 59 northeast of Winnipeg and ends in the town of Lac du Bonnet.  It is a paved two-lane highway with a distance of

References

External links 
Official Highway Map of Manitoba - Eastern

317